Herman Miller (November 11, 1833 – May 29, 1922) was an American politician and businessman.

Born in Pommerania, Prussia, Germany, Miller emigrated to the United States in 1856 and settled in Marathon County, Wisconsin. He manufactured shingles and worked in a store. Miller also owned a hotel in Wausau, Wisconsin. He served a register of deeds for Marathon County. Miller also served on the Wausau village board and the Marathon County Board Supervisors. He was a Republican. Miller served in the Wisconsin State Assembly from 1901 to 1905.

Notes

1833 births
1922 deaths
German emigrants to the United States
Politicians from Wausau, Wisconsin
Businesspeople from Wisconsin
Wisconsin city council members
County officials in Wisconsin
County supervisors in Wisconsin
Republican Party members of the Wisconsin State Assembly